Oliver T Hellriegel (born July 30, 1965) is a German–American author and consultant.

Career
Hellriegel is currently appointed in a teaching position at Macromedia University in Munich, Germany, where he has been part of a digital learning initiative on Design Thinking. He has been a faculty member in various universities since 2007, and held a position as Dean of Studies in Visual and Corporate Communications at Fresenius University's School of Design.

Oliver T. Hellriegel co-authored a book on Social Media (Social Media Compass) and is considered a researcher in the field of effects on interpersonal relationships as well as using social media for news purposes. He is a frequent author in of Germany's leading magazines on digital transformation: iBusiness as well as in various magazines and books. He has been speaking at several research conferences all over Europe (Glocal: Inside Social Media, New York University Skopje, Macedonia; IDEA:Exchange, Goldsmiths, University of London, UK; Munich Science Days, FOM University of Applied Sciences, Munich, Germany; Digital Marketing Congress, University of Hamburg, Germany).

Hellriegel is also partner in a business consulting company, specialized on digital transformation. In his role as professor and consultant he is a frequent member of a delegation to the Federal Ministry for Economic Affairs and Energy in Germany.

References

External links 
 ensego.de
 Article on Brand Management
 Advertising Agencies — On The Road to Nowhere?

1965 births
Living people
Academic staff of the Munich University of Applied Sciences
Technical University of Kaiserslautern alumni
People from Kaiserslautern
Businesspeople from Rhineland-Palatinate